Epepeotes lugubris is a species of beetle in the family Cerambycidae. It was described by Francis Polkinghorne Pascoe in 1866, originally under the genus Diochares. It is known from Sulawesi.

References

lugubris
Beetles described in 1866